Orthodox Peronism, or simply Peronist orthodoxy, was the name it received in Argentina, a current of Peronism nucleated around the sectors that brought together his total follow up of the policies established in the government of the Peron–Peron formula, and that they do not adhere and flatly reject outright revolutionary Peronism. This doctrine ranges from simple centrists, to reaching the most radicals expressions anti-Marxists and anti-Semites of the Extreme right.Generally erroneously included in the term of the Peronist right, since it does not conform to the right entire justicialist national.

Orthodox Peronism, has been in several conflicts with the Tendencia Revolucionaria (opposite current in the Peronist movement), like the called, Ezeiza massacre.
Dirty War
Peronism
Terrorism in Argentina
Political repression in Argentina
National Reorganization Process
Political movements in Argentina
Far-right politics in Argentina
History of Argentina (1973–1976)
Paramilitary organisations based in Argentina
Counterterrorism in Argentina
Anti-communism in Argentina

Origin of the denomination 
Originally, the term orthodoxy took its back, during the years of the Peronist resistance, to those sectors of Peronism that were most intransigent and most reluctant to accept any kind of agreement with the government. They were even characterized by their rejection of the neo-Peronist, Vandorist or conciliatory aspects that had begun to emerge in the movement in the sixties. In the following decade, with the return of Perón to the republic and the notable shift to the right of the government, it began to encompass those sectors that, appealing to verticality, sought to avoid any kind of rapprochement with the so-called Marxism or the Peronist left. The orthodox Peronists became those who, vindicating their loyalty to Perón and his wife (Estela Martínez de Peron), supported the "Peronist homeland" against the "socialist homeland" advocated by the left wing of the movement.

Ideology (since 70s) 
These are the main ideological postulates to which they adhered orthodox Peronism:
 Total or great adherence to the governments of Juan D. Perón and María E. Martínez de Perón from 1973. 
 Opposition to the most youthful and combative sectors of Peronism identified as "the tendency" and the "socialist homeland", considering them outside the Peronist movement.
 The reaffirmation of the Third Position, distancing itself from both the United States and the USSR.

Different political analysts and historians agree in placing him on the right and extreme right. Although they point out that it is not necessary to fall into the error of simply classifying them within the political spectrum of the right and extreme right, because not all of them sympathized with aspects of the nationalist and conservative right; since they simply wanted to distance themselves from the ideological postulates of the Revolutionary Tendency. At the same time, it must be taken into account that the most extremist sector As already mentioned above never accepted the qualification itself as right-wing, but rather called themselves of Third Position.

In addition, orthodox Peronism has also been described as semi-fascist because its leader had several relations with fascist Italy and the Franco fascism. Or simply because of their proximity to political positions with respect to nationalism, the left in general, the Jews, etc. The only government created by Peronist orthodoxy, has often been described as neo-fascist. This classification has also been diagnosed by the opposing groups of the left. This trend was also given the connotation of advocating anti-Semitism, anti-capitalism, anti-communism, discrimination against homosexual people, comparing them to drug addicts; relating everything that for them was aberrant and immoral with the supposedly left, it was therefore a question of pointing them out as not very loyal and far from Peronist orthodoxy, that is to say: "traitors, infiltrators and heterodox".

Orthodoxy organizations 

In the seventies, there were several terrorist organizations that adhered to this Peronism. 
Among the main groups of Orthodox Peronism I include the Orthodox Peronist Youth, with Adrián Curi as executive secretary; Concentration of the Peronist Youth, with Martín Salas as organization secretary; Peronist Union Youth, which has Claudio Mazota in the union secretariat; the Iron Guard, the Falangist National University Concentration; the Peronist Youth of the Argentine Republic, National Student Front, which had Víctor Lorefice as press and finance secretary, and the neo-Nazi and Anisemite organization the Tacuara Nationalist Movement is also part of this movement. The Alianza Anticomunista Argentina (AAA) also Is included, although it is not yet clear if it is its own political organization, a mere death squad, or a confederation of right-wing groups. Other minor groups such as the Rucci are also part of this denominatin.

Actualidad 
Currently, several politicians consider federal Peronism the informal successor of orthodox politics, Some is present in the opposition coalition of the Frente de Todos government. If we refer specifically to Orthodox Peronism, there are very few organizations that identify with this historical and ideological process. A clear example could be the Popular Dignity party or The Second Republic Proyect .

Notes

References